Kasper Lindholm Jessen (born ) is a Danish male  track cyclist, riding for the national team. He competed in the sprint and keirin event at the 2010 UCI Track Cycling World Championships.

References

External links
 Profile at cyclingarchives.com

1985 births
Living people
Danish track cyclists
Danish male cyclists
Place of birth missing (living people)
20th-century Danish people
21st-century Danish people